Des Hughes (born 1970) is a British artist who lives and works in London and Herefordshire.

He completed an MA in Fine Art at Goldsmiths College, London in 2002, following a BA in Fine Art at Bath College of Art in 1994.

Hughes' sculptural practice engages with traditional sculptural materials in new and inventive ways: mixing bronze with organic material for instance. He is also fascinated by the strangeness of British art, whether it be primitive art, strange craft objects or the reinvention of landscape, still life in British Surrealism and modernist British sculptural history.
He has guest curated an exhibition at Manchester Art Gallery and has been longlisted for the Fourth Plinth, Trafalgar Square, London.

Exhibitions
Hughes' work has been the subject of major solo exhibitions both nationally and internationally including, Laing Art Gallery, Newcastle upon Tyne (2005) Michael Benevento, Los Angeles (2008), Frieze Art Fair (2010), Nottingham Contemporary (2010)  Ancient & Modern, London (2012) Buchmann Galerie, Berlin (2013) Manchester Art Gallery (2013)  The Henry Moore Foundation, Perry Green, UK (2014) and The Hepworth Wakefield, UK (2015-Spring 2016)

Selected group shows include, Bart Wells Institute, Hamish McKay, Wellington, New Zealand (2004), Art Out of Place, Castle Museum, Norwich (2005), Strange Weight,  Martos Gallery, New York (2007), Strange Events Permit Themselves the Luxury of Occurring, Camden Arts Centre, London (2007), Art Now: Beating the Bourds, Tate Britain, London (2009), Never The Same River (Possible Futures, Probable Pasts), Camden Arts Centre, London, curated by Simon Starling (2010) and 'BigMinis, Fetishes of Crisis', cur Alexi Vaillant, CAPC Musée d'art contemporain de Bordeaux (2010) Dystopia, CAPC, Musée d'art contemporain, Bordeaux (2011), Sometimes I wish I could just disappear', David Risley Gallery, Copenhagen (2011), The Sleepers, Clare Woods and Des Hughes, Pallant House, UK (2016)

Collections
Hughes' work is held in many major collections including Arts Council Collection, Whitworth Art Gallery and Manchester Art Gallery.

External links
 Bio
 Des Hughes
 Des Hughes | NewArtCentre.
 

British artists
British contemporary artists
Living people
1970 births
Alumni of Goldsmiths, University of London